The 1961 Cork Senior Hurling Championship was the 73rd staging of the Cork Senior Hurling Championship since its establishment by the Cork County Board in 1887. The draw for the opening round fixtures took place at the Cork Convention on 29 January 1961. The championship began ob 9 April 1961 and ended on 17 September 1961.

Glen Rovers were the defending champions, however, they were defeated by Avondhu at the semi-final stage.

On 17 September 1961, Blackrock won the championship following a 4-10 to 3-7 defeat of Avondhu in the final. This was their 23rd championship title overall and their first title in five championship seasons.

Avondhu's Richie Browne was the championship's top scorer with 9-11.

Team changes

To Championship

Promoted from the Cork Intermediate Hurling Championship
Passage
 St. Vincent's

Results

First round

Quarter-finals

Semi-finals

Final

Championship statistics

Top scorers

Top scorer overall

Top scorers in a single game

Miscellaneous

 Avondhu miss out on the double after they won the 1961 Cork Senior Football Championship

References

Cork Senior Hurling Championship
Cork Senior Hurling Championship